Henry Monroe McDonald (January 16, 1911 – October 17, 1982) was a Major League Baseball pitcher who played in  and  with the Philadelphia Athletics and the St. Louis Browns. He batted and threw right-handed.

Biography

Career
Henry "Hank" McDonald made his major league debut with the Philadelphia Athletics on April 16, 1931 where he pitched 6.2 innings while giving up 3 runs on 7 hits in his loss to the Washington Senators.  During his first year with the Athletics, Hank McDonald earned a salary of $2,500 ($ today) while playing under famed baseball manager, Connie Mack.

References

External links

Play-by-play and box scores available at: or Retrosheet Boxscores

1911 births
1982 deaths
Major League Baseball pitchers
Baseball players from California
Philadelphia Athletics players
St. Louis Browns players